Panathur is a major town in Vellarikundu Taluk of  Kasaragod district in Kerala State, India. It belongs to Kanhangad legislative constituency. Its population is about 12,000. It lies 1 km away from Kerala - Karnataka border, 42 km away from the nearest municipality, Kanhangad and 53 km away from the district headquarters, Kasaragod. It is surrounded from three sides by forest reserves and cashew plantations. Kudumbur River flows adjacent to the town.

Religion

Sree Dharmasastha Temple
Sree Dharmasastha temple is a Hindu temple situated in Panathur. This temple has many old stories. Many people from different places come to worship here.

Juma Masjid
Panathur Juma Masjid is a place of worship for Muslims, and was built in hijra* 123. (*hijra is the Arabic calendar.)

There are two masjids situated in Panathur. One is Town Masjid situated in Panathur town and another is Juma Masjid which is situated in Pallikkal, Panathur.

In Juma Masjid there is a Makham having four shuhada. Every year there is a big "ഉറൂസ്" festival done here. There is a school under this masjid.

St Mary's Church
The Christian church named Saint Mary is located in Panathur and is a centre of worship for Christians.

There is a kindergarten managed by the church.

Transportation
Panathur is able to connect with Karnataka state by 2 major roads, Kanhangad -panathur -madikeri highway and Panathur- sullia interstate road. KSRTC and private buses provide routes to Kanhangad, Kasaragod, Mangalore, Mysore, Bangalore, Pala and Kottayam.
The Nearest Railway Station is Kanhangad on Mangalore-Palakkad Line.
The Nearest Airport is Mangalore International Airport in North and Kannur International Airport in South.

Image gallery

References

Panathur area